John Joseph Haldane  (born 19 February 1954) is a British philosopher, commentator and broadcaster. He is a former papal adviser to the Vatican. He is credited with coining the term 'analytical Thomism' and is himself a Thomist in the analytic tradition. Haldane is associated with The Veritas Forum and is the current chair of the Royal Institute of Philosophy.

Education
Haldane attended Hamilton Park School, John Ogilvie Hall Preparatory School and St Aloysius' College, Glasgow. Later he studied at the Kent Institute of Art & Design (now the University for the Creative Arts) in Rochester, Kent, and the Wimbledon School of Art (now Wimbledon College of Arts, University of the Arts London) for a BA in fine art in 1975.

He received a BA in philosophy from Birkbeck College of the University of London in 1980; a PGCE from the London University Institute of Education in 1976; and a PhD in philosophy from Birkbeck College in 1984. He holds honorary degrees from Saint Anselm College, New Hampshire, United States, from the University of Glasgow, Scotland, and from University of Notre Dame Australia. He was named one of Scotland's "Brights" in a list of the 50 top Scottish intellectuals, artists, lawyers, scientists, etc. (Herald Magazine, 2001).

Family
Haldane spent his childhood in Glasgow, and subsequently studied in Rochester and London. In 1980 he was married to his wife Hilda at Westminster Cathedral. They have four children; Kirsty (b. 1988), James (b. 1990), Alice (b. 1992) and John (b. 1994).

Career
He has been a visiting lecturer in the School of Architecture of the University of Westminster, at the Medical School of the University of Dundee, at the University of Malta, at the Thomistic Institute at the University of Notre Dame, at the University of Aberdeen, at Denison University, at the University of St. Thomas, at The John Paul II Catholic University of Lublin, and the Institute for the Psychological Sciences. He held the Royden Davis Chair of Humanities at Georgetown University, and delivered the Gifford Lectures at the University of Aberdeen in 2003–04, and the Joseph Lectures at the Gregorian University in Rome.

He was appointed to the University of St Andrews in 1983 where he held a lectureship and a readership. He was subsequently University Professor in Philosophy from 1994 to 2015.  From 1988 to 2000 and from 2002 to the present he has been Director of the University Centre for Ethics, Philosophy and Public Affairs. In addition, he has held fellowships at the University of Pittsburgh, University of Edinburgh, St John's College, Oxford, Social Philosophy and Policy Center, Bowling Green State University and at the Centre for the Study of Sculpture in Leeds, West Yorkshire.  Since 2015, he has held the J. Newton Rayzor Sr. Distinguished Chair in Philosophy at Baylor University.

Cultural and artistic interests
Haldane has simultaneously pursued a career in the cultural sphere. He is a regular contributor to renowned publications including The Burlington Magazine, Modern Painters, Tate and Art Monthly.

Television work
The majority of Haldane's television work is for the BBC, including The Big Questions on nuclear armament.  He has contributed to a number of programmes including The Heart of the Matter: God Under the Microscope, Newsnight, and Twenty Four Hours. He has also produced work for ITV and PBS.

Newspapers
In addition to his former position as a regularly contributing columnist, Haldane has offered opinions and contributed articles to periodicals including The Times, Daily Telegraph, The Scotsman, New Statesman, The Herald, Sunday Herald, Mail on Sunday, Daily Mail, Daily Express, Contemporary Review and Economist Information Strategy.

Radio broadcasts
Haldane's radio work includes contributions to the following stations:
 BBC Radio Three: Nightwaves, The Brains Trust, Concert Intermission Talks
 BBC Radio Four: Afternoon Shift, In Our Time, Moral Maze, Today Programme, Start the Week, and Sunday Programme.
 BBC Radio Scotland: Benchmark, Colin Bell Programme, Colin McKay Programme, Good Morning Scotland, Personal Touch, Realms of Engagement, Speaking Out, Thought for the Day, The Usual Suspects and Values Added.
 BBC World Service: Agenda, Matter for Debate, Newsround, and The World Today.
 ABC (Australia): Late Night Live, and National Breakfast Programme
 USA Public Service Radio

Fellowships
 Royal Society of Arts, London (Fellow, 1995).
 Royal Society of Edinburgh, (Fellow, 1995).
 St Anselm College, NH (Hon. LLD, 1997).
 University of Glasgow, (Hon. D.Litt., 2008).
 The Witherspoon Institute, Princeton, New Jersey (Senior Fellow).
 KHS: Ordo Equestris Sancti Sepulchri Hierosolymitani

Publications and others 
   Listed by Blackwell in its 'Tomorrow's Classics' leaflet.

Co-edited works

References

External links
St Andrews University
Haldane's University page
The Veritas Forum: John Haldane

1954 births
Living people
John Joseph
Alumni of the University for the Creative Arts
Alumni of Birkbeck, University of London
Analytic philosophers  
Analytic theologians
Scottish philosophers
Academics of the University of St Andrews
Fellows of the Royal Society of Edinburgh
Catholic philosophers
Scottish Roman Catholics
University of Notre Dame faculty
Scottish historians of philosophy
People educated at St Aloysius' College, Glasgow
Scottish columnists
Alumni of Wimbledon College of Arts
Philosophers of religion
Analytical Thomists
Witherspoon Institute